Vanineh-ye Sofla (also Romanized as Vanīneh-ye Soflá; also known as Vanaineh Sufla, Vanenah-e Pā’īn, Vanineh Sofla, Vanīneh-ye Pā’īn, Voneyneh-ye Pā’īn, and Voneyneh-ye Soflá) is a village in Kumasi Rural District, in the Central District of Marivan County, Kurdistan Province, Iran. At the 2006 census, its population was 176, in 36 families. The village is populated by Kurds.

References 

Towns and villages in Marivan County
Kurdish settlements in Kurdistan Province